Sphinx is a 1979 novel by Robin Cook. It follows a young American Egyptologist named Erica Baron, on a working vacation in Egypt, who stumbles into a dangerous vortex of intrigue after seeing an ancient Egyptian statue of Seti I in a Cairo market. Cook's third novel, it is one of the few not centered on medicine.

In 1981, the novel was adapted into the film Sphinx starring Lesley-Anne Down as Erica and Frank Langella as Ahmed Khazzan.

References

1979 American novels
American thriller novels
Novels by Robin Cook
Macmillan Publishers books
Novels set in Egypt
American novels adapted into films